Heneage Finch, 6th Earl of Aylesford DL (24 December 1824 – 10 January 1871), styled Lord Guernsey until 1859, was a British peer and politician.

Background
Born in Packington, Warwickshire, Aylesford was the son of Heneage Finch, 5th Earl of Aylesford and his wife Lady Augusta Sophia, fourth daughter of George Greville, 2nd Earl of Warwick.

Cricket
A keen amateur cricketer, Aylesford played first-class cricket mostly for the Marylebone Cricket Club, but also played first-class cricket for other teams. He made 21 first-class appearances, scoring 200 runs at an average of 7.14, with a high score of 28 not out.

Political career
Finch became a major of the Warwickshire Yeomanry Cavalry in 1848 and represented the county as Deputy Lieutenant from 1852. He entered the British House of Commons in 1849, sitting for Warwickshire South until 1857. Two years later, he succeeded his father in the earldom and took his seat in the House of Lords.

Family
Lord Aylesford married Jane Wightwick Knightley (1827–1911), only daughter and heiress of John Wightwick Knightley of Offchurch Bury in Warwickshire, in 1846. They had two sons and one daughter. He died in London in January 1871, aged 46, and was succeeded in the earldom by his eldest son, Heneage. The Countess of Aylesford died in October 1911.

References

External links 
 

1824 births
1871 deaths
Deputy Lieutenants of Warwickshire
6
Members of the Parliament of the United Kingdom for English constituencies
UK MPs 1847–1852
UK MPs 1852–1857
Aylesford, E6
Warwickshire Yeomanry officers
Heneage
English cricketers
Marylebone Cricket Club cricketers
North v South cricketers
English cricketers of 1826 to 1863
Gentlemen of the North cricketers
Presidents of the Marylebone Cricket Club
Gentlemen of England cricketers
Over 30s v Under 30s cricketers